C-myc promoter-binding protein is a protein that in humans is encoded by the DENND4A gene.

References

Further reading

External links